Copthall South Fields is a six hectare Site of Local Importance for Nature Conservation, next to Fiveways Corner on the A1, in Mill Hill in the London Borough of Barnet.

It has several fields with scattered trees and ancient hedgerows. The trees are mainly oak, ash and field maple. The fields contain wild flowers such as meadow vetchling and meadow buttercup, and there are stands of tall herbs. A small plot of native woodland has been planted in the northern field by Watling Chase Community Forest.

There is access from Page Street, near Fiveways Corner, and from Champions Way.

Gallery

See also

 Nature reserves in Barnet

References

Further reading

Nature reserves in the London Borough of Barnet
Parks and open spaces in the London Borough of Barnet